Caloptilia linearis is a moth of the family Gracillariidae. It is known from New Zealand.

The larvae of this species mine and fold the leaves of Coriaria arborea.

References

linearis
Moths of New Zealand
Moths described in 1877
Taxa named by Arthur Gardiner Butler
Endemic fauna of New Zealand
Endemic moths of New Zealand